Abul Kalam Mohammad or Abul Kalam Muhammed (often abbreviated AKM) is a common compound male given name, especially in Bangladesh.  People with the name include:

 Abul Kalam Md. Ahasanul Hoque Chowdhury (born 1968), Bangladeshi politician
 Abul Kalam Mohammad Ziaur Rahman, Bangladeshi military officer
 AKM Enamul Haque Shamim (born 1965), Bangladeshi politician
 AKM Yusuf (1926–2014), Bangladeshi politician
 Abul Kalam Mohammed Zakaria (1918–2016), Bangladeshi scholar and archaeologist